The 1983 All-Ireland Minor Hurling Championship was the 53rd staging of the All-Ireland Minor Hurling Championship since its establishment by the Gaelic Athletic Association in 1928.

Tipperary entered the championship as the defending champions, however, they were beaten by Galway in the All-Ireland semi-final.

On 4 September 1983, Galway won the championship following a 0-10 to 0-7 defeat of Dublin in the All-Ireland final. This was their first ever All-Ireland title.

Results

Munster Minor Hurling Championship

First round

Semi-finals

Final

All-Ireland Minor Hurling Championship

Semi-finals

Final

References

External links
 All-Ireland Minor Hurling Championship: Roll Of Honour

Minor
All-Ireland Minor Hurling Championship